Dārīyān may refer to:
Dariyan, Iran
Daryan (disambiguation), places in Iran